Gavrilovo is a rural locality (a village) in Sizemskoye Rural Settlement, Sheksninsky District, Vologda Oblast, Russia. The population was 1 as of 2002.

Geography 
Gavrilovo is located 49 km northeast of Sheksna (the district's administrative centre) by road. Aksenovo is the nearest rural locality.

References 

Rural localities in Sheksninsky District